Such a Long Journey is a 1998 Indo-Canadian English language film based on the novel of the same name written by Rohinton Mistry. The film is directed by Sturla Gunnarsson with a screenplay by Sooni Taraporevala. The film received twelve Genie Awards nominations including the Best Picture, Best Director, and Best Actor. The film was screened at the Toronto International Film Festival.

Plot
Gustad Noble (Roshan Seth) is a Parsi bank clerk who lives with his family in Bombay (Mumbai), just before the Indo-Pakistani War of 1971. At first, he seems to be a self-centered, self-involved, neurotic man, who is so tied up in his own pain for perceived slights both past and present that he cannot seem to connect with either friends or family.

He is haunted by memories of his privileged youth and his father's fortune, which has been lost to the machinations of an unscrupulous uncle.  He is baffled by the changes wrought in his eldest son, Sohrab (Vrajesh Hirjee), who refuses to attend the Indian Institute of Technology to which he has gained admittance, and worried about his youngest daughter, Roshan, when she falls ill. Other conflicts involve Gustad's ongoing interactions with his eccentric neighbors and his relationship with his close friend and co-worker, Dinshawji. Tehmul, a seemingly unimportant and mentally disabled character, is essential in Gustad's life, as he brings out his tender side and represents innocence in life.

A letter that Gustad receives one day from an old friend, Major Bilimoria, slowly draws him into a government deception involving threats, secrecy, and large amounts of money. He then begins the long journey that sheds new light on all aspects of Gustad's life.

Production 
The production of the film underwent several challenges related to casting, funding and concerns about censoring. These topics are covered in two interviews in Rungh: the first with the filmmaker Sturla Gunnarsson and the second with the actor Naseeruddin Shah.

Cast

Roshan Seth as Gustad Noble
Soni Razdan as Dilnavaz Noble
Om Puri as Ghulam Mohamed
Naseeruddin Shah as Major Jimmy Bilimoria
Ranjit Chowdhry as Pavement Artist
Sam Dastor as Dinshawji
Kurush Deboo as Tehmul
Pearl Padamsee as Mrs. Kutpitia
Vrajesh Hirjee as Sohrab Noble
Dinyar Contractor as Rabadi
Souad Faress as Mrs. Rabadi
Irrfan Khan as Gustad's dad
Anahita Uberoi as Gustad's mom
Anupam Shyam as milkman
Shazneed Damania as Roshan Noble
Kurush Dastur as Darius Noble
Noshirwan Jehangir as Inspector Bamji
Shivani Jha as Jasmine Rabadi
Madan as Bank Manager
Aileen Gonsalves as Lewie Coutinho
Sunny Bharti as Prostitute
Pratima Kazmi as Prostitute
Madhav Sharma
Antony Zaki
Mehler Jehangir	 
Sohrab Ardeshir	
Rashid Karapiet		
Chatru L. Gurnani

References

External links
 

1998 films
Films based on Canadian novels
English-language Indian films
Canadian drama films
British Indian films
Films about Indian Canadians
1998 independent films
Films directed by Sturla Gunnarsson
Films set in Mumbai
Films about the Research and Analysis Wing
Films with screenplays by Sooni Taraporevala
English-language Canadian films
1990s English-language films
1990s Canadian films